Gymnoclytia unicolor is a North American species of tachinid flies in the genus Gymnoclytia of the family Tachinidae.

Distribution
California, Utah, Texas, Arkansas, North Carolina, Florida & Michigan

References

External links
 Taxonomic & Host Catalogue of the Tachinidae of America North of Mexico

Phasiinae
Diptera of North America
Insects described in 1946